Chayathorn Tapsuvanavon (born 12 March 2000) is a Thai professional footballer who plays as a defensive midfielder for Thai League 1 club Bangkok United.

References

External links

2000 births
Living people
Chayathorn Tapsuvanavon
Chayathorn Tapsuvanavon
Chayathorn Tapsuvanavon
Association football midfielders
Chayathorn Tapsuvanavon
Chayathorn Tapsuvanavon
Expatriate footballers in Japan
Thai expatriate footballers
Thai expatriate sportspeople in Japan